Winder is a masculine given name. Notable people with the name include:

 Winder Cuevas (born 1988), Dominican Republic hurdler
 Winder R. Harris (1888–1973), American journalist, civil servant, and politician
 Winder Laird Henry (1864–1940), American politician

Masculine given names